Iwo or IWO may refer to:

People
 Iwo Byczewski (born 1948), Polish diplomat
 Iwo Dölling (1923–2019), Swedish diplomat
 Iwo Gall (1890–1959), Polish theater director, stage designer, and pedagogue
 Iwo Kaczmarski (born 2004), Polish footballer
 Iwo Lominski (1905–1968), Polish-born microbiologist
 Iwo Odrowąż (died 1229), medieval Polish humanist, statesman, and bishop
 Iwo Cyprian Pogonowski (1921–2016), Polish-born polymath and inventor
 Iwo Zaniewski (born 1956), Polish painter, photographer, director, and artistic director

Places 
 Iwo Islands, another name for the Volcano Islands of Japan, of which Iwo Jima is one
Iwo Jima, a small island in Japan, site of the Battle of Iwo Jima during World War II
 Iwo Kingdom, a traditional state based on the city of Iwo in Osun State, Nigeria
 Iwo, Osun, a city in the Nigerian state of Osun

Other uses 
IWO, the International Workers Order, a pro-Communist fraternal organization and insurance company

See also 
 Ivo